Tamon George (born November 21, 1987) is a former professional Canadian football defensive back who played for the Saskatchewan Roughriders of the Canadian Football League (CFL). He was drafted by the Roughriders in the second round of the 2009 CFL Draft and signed with the team May 26, 2009. He played CIS football for the Regina Rams.

References

External links
Saskatchewan Roughriders bio

1987 births
Canadian football defensive backs
Living people
Sportspeople from Regina, Saskatchewan
Players of Canadian football from Saskatchewan
Regina Rams players
Saskatchewan Roughriders players